Mayfair Melody is a 1937 British musical film, directed by Arthur B. Woods and starring popular bass-baritone singer Keith Falkner in the first of his three screen performances.

It was made at Teddington Studios by the British subsidiary of Warner Brothers. The film was a quota quickie production, featuring Falkner as a factory hand whose wonderful singing voice is discovered by the daughter of the factory owner.  She then guides him up the ladder to fame and fortune as a professional singer.  Mayfair Melody is now classed as a lost film.

Cast
 Keith Falkner as Mark
 Chili Bouchier as Carmen
 Bruce Lester as Dickie
 Joyce Kirby as Brenda
 Glen Alyn as Daphne
 Aubrey Mallalieu as Dighton
 George Galleon as Lord Chester
 Louis Goodrich as Ludborough  
 Ian McLean as Collecchi  
 Vivienne Chatterton as Mme. Collecchi

References

Bibliography
 Low, Rachael. Filmmaking in 1930s Britain. George Allen & Unwin, 1985.
 Wood, Linda. British Films, 1927-1939. British Film Institute, 1986.

External links 
 
 Mayfair at BFI Film & TV Database

1937 films
British musical films
1937 musical films
Films directed by Arthur B. Woods
Lost British films
1930s English-language films
British black-and-white films
Films shot at Teddington Studios
Warner Bros. films
1937 lost films
Lost musical films
1930s British films